Lawrence Norfolk (born 1963) is a British novelist known for historical works with complex plots and intricate detail.

Biography
Though born in London, Norfolk lived in Iraq until 1967 and then in the West Country of England. He read English at King's College London and graduated in 1986. He worked briefly as a teacher and later as a freelance writer for reference-book publishers.

In 1992 he won the Somerset Maugham Award for his first novel, Lemprière's Dictionary, about events surrounding the publication, in 1788, of John Lemprière's Bibliotheca Classica on classical mythology and history.
The novel starts out as a detective story and mixes historical elements with steampunk-style fiction. 
It imagines the writing of Lemprière's dictionary as tied to the founding of the British East India Company and the Siege of La Rochelle generations before; it also visits the Austro-Turkish War.

Norfolk based his second novel, The Pope's Rhinoceros, on the story of an actual animal; see Dürer's Rhinoceros. Themes in the work  include the lost city of Vineta in the Baltic, the sack of Prato, and the Benin bronze-making culture on the river Niger.

The third novel, In the Shape of a Boar, juxtaposes the flight of a Bukovina Jew in World War II with the legend of Atalanta in Calydon.

Literary works
 Lemprière's Dictionary (1991)
 The Pope's Rhinoceros (1996)
 In the Shape of a Boar (2000)
 John Saturnall's Feast (2012)

References 

1963 births
Living people
20th-century British novelists
21st-century British novelists
Alumni of King's College London
Associates of King's College London
Postmodern writers
British male novelists
20th-century British male writers
21st-century British male writers